This is a list of major by-elections in Taiwan, with the names of the incumbent and victor and their respective parties.

Local by-elections (mayors and magistrates)

Legislative Yuan by-elections

References 

 

 
Taiwan